Koirala is a common surname among upadhayay brahmin and chettri nepal and some parts of northeast India. All Koiralas share the same gotra, Moudgalya.

Notable people with surname Koirala
Koirala family, a dominating family in Nepalese politics
Anuradha Koirala (born 1949), Nepalese social activist, founder and director of Maiti Nepal
Bhagawan Koirala (born 1960), Executive Director & Senior Consultant Cardiac Surgeon
Bishweshwar Prasad Koirala (B.P. Koirala) (1914–1982), Prime Minister of Nepal from 1959 to 1960
Bharat Koirala, winner of the 2002 Ramon Magsaysay Award for Journalism
Girija Prasad Koirala (1925–2010), five times Prime Minister of Nepal in the 1990s and 2000s, Head of State from 2007 to 2008
Krishna Prasad Koirala (died 1943), political leader of Nepal 
Manisha Koirala (born 1970), Indian Bollywood actress
Matrika Prasad Koirala (1912–1997), Prime Minister of Nepal from 1951 to 1952 and from 1953 to 1955
Prakash Koirala, Nepalese politician
Raj Ballav Koirala (born 1982), Nepalese actor
Shashanka Koirala (born 1958), Nepalese politician
Siddharth Koirala, Nepalese film actor
Sujata Koirala (born 1954), Deputy Prime Minister of Nepal
Sujata Koirala, Nepalese actress
Sushil Koirala (1939–2016), Prime Minister of Nepal from 2014 to 2015
Tarini Prasad Koirala (1923–1973), Nepalese politician, journalist and writer

References

Nepali-language surnames
Khas surnames